Sălașu de Sus is a commune in Hunedoara County, Transylvania, Romania. It is composed of eleven villages: Coroiești (Korojesd), Mălăiești (Malajesd), Nucșoara (Nuksora), Ohaba de sub Piatră (Kőaljaohába), Paroș (Parospestere), Peștera (Pestere), Râu Alb (Fehérvíz), Râu Mic (Vajdej), Sălașu de Jos (Alsószálláspatak), Sălașu de Sus and Zăvoi (Macesd).

Natives
 Ion Itu

References

Communes in Hunedoara County
Localities in Transylvania
Țara Hațegului